Brian Walter Natale Santarpia is a Canadian naval officer. He joined Maritime Command in 1986 and served in various postings before rising to commanding officer of the frigate  from 2007 to 2008. This was followed by a posting to Commanding Officer of Sea Training Atlantic and then advisor to the Vice Chief of the Defence Staff. Santarpia then commanded Canada's chief naval base on its Atlantic coast, CFB Halifax, with promotion to commodore and the position of Director General Naval Personnel. In June 2020, Santarpia became Commander Maritime Forces Atlantic.

Career
He joined the Canadian Forces as part of Maritime Command as a MARS (Maritime Surface/Sub-surface) officer in 1986 and served in various postings before commanding  from January 2007 to July 2008.

This was followed by a stint as Commanding Officer of Sea Training Atlantic. In 2009 he was promoted to captain and served as an advisor to the Vice Chief of the Defence Staff before taking command of CFB Halifax.

He was promoted to commodore in July 2013 as Director General Naval Personnel. In December 2014 he commanded Combined Task Force 150.

He was appointed Commander Maritime Forces Atlantic in June 2020.

In 2020, as chief of staff of the Canadian Joint Operations Command, Rear Adm. Santarpia supported using the COVID-19 pandemic as an opportunity to test propaganda techniques on Canadians, saying “This is really a learning opportunity for all of us and a chance to start getting information operations into our (CAF-DND) routine."

Awards and decorations
Santarpia's personal awards and decorations include the following:

110px

 Command Commendation

References

Canadian admirals
Living people
Year of birth missing (living people)